Lizoperci is a village in the municipality of Prozor-Rama, Bosnia and Herzegovina.

Demographics 
According to the 2013 census, its population was 97, all Bosniaks.

References

Populated places in Prozor-Rama